Jordan King (born 26 February 1994 in Warwick) is a British racing driver from Harbury, Warwickshire who last competed in the 2019–20 FIA World Endurance Championship. He is currently a reserve and development driver for the Mahindra Formula E Team.

In 2019, King competed in the FIA Formula 2 Championship, FIA World Endurance Championship in LMP1 and LMP2, and the NTT IndyCar Series. He made debuts in both the Indianapolis 500 and the 24 Hours of Le Mans. He also tested in Formula One, Formula E and the British Touring Car Championship.

Personal life 

He attended Repton School in Derbyshire on a C. B. Fry scholarship and later Princethorpe College in Warwickshire . King is the son of former Sainsbury's CEO Justin King.

King is also an avid fundraiser for Birmingham Children's Hospital, having raised over £8,500 in 2019 alone while cycling the North Coast 500.
 In 2020, he plans to run the 84-mile Hadrian's Wall Path to continue his fundraising efforts.

Career

Formula Renault 2.0 UK
King's early racing career began in karting before he moved to open-wheel racing at the end of 2010. He began driving in Formula Renault UK, starting in the Formula Renault UK Winter Series before he began the main championship in 2011.

FIA Formula Two Championship
In 2009, aged only fifteen, King tested a Formula Two car. He drove four races in Formula Palmer Audi at the Silverstone round in 2010, managing to get a podium and impressing series boss Jonathan Palmer. In 2011, he has signed up for three rounds of the Formula Two championship, at Spa-Francorchamps, the Nürburgring and Brands Hatch during the Formula Renault UK summer break. King will be the youngest driver to take part in the modern era of the series.

GP2 Series 
In February 2015, it was confirmed King would move up to GP2, signing with Racing Engineering, alongside Alexander Rossi, for 2015, where he finished twelfth overall. He remained with the team for the following season, where he claimed two victories and finished seventh overall.

FIA Formula 2 Championship

2017 
In , King switched to MP Motorsport for a third season of the sport.

2019 

For , King returned with the same team partnered with Indian driver Mahaveer Raghunathan. King missed the Monaco round due to his participation in the 2019 Indianapolis 500, with Artem Markelov serving as his substitute. King scored two podium finished during the season, claiming the 3rd position in the feature race at Baku and 2nd in the sprint race at Monza. He had 15 top 10 finishes in his 20 races and completed 98.7% of all laps.

King holds two F2 track records, both set in 2017, at Circuit de Spa-Francorchamps and Autodromo Nazionale di Monza.

Formula One
He made his début in a Formula One session when he drove for Manor during free practice at the 2016 United States Grand Prix.

He is currently a simulator driver for the Alpine F1 Team.

IndyCar Series 
In 2018, King signed with Ed Carpenter Racing as a part-time driver in the No. 20 car, sharing driving duties with owner Ed Carpenter. Carpenter started the ovals, while King started the 11 road and street circuit races. In his IndyCar Series debut, the season opening Firestone Grand Prix of St. Petersburg, he set the track record in qualifying, made the Firestone Fast 6 and took the lead of the race on only the fifth lap. His second Fast 6 appearance came at the Indianapolis Motor Speedway during qualifications for the INDYCAR Grand Prix. He also paced the field during the only international stop in 2018, the Honda Indy Toronto. King advanced out of the first round of qualifications in half of the possible races over the course of the season.

King returned to Indy car racing in 2019 to make his Indianapolis 500 debut with Rahal Letterman Lanigan Racing. The 2019 Indianapolis 500 was his first-ever oval race. He successfully qualified his No. 42 on the first day, locking in the 26th starting position.

FIA World Endurance Championship 
King also made his debut in prototype racing in 2019. He signed with Jackie Chan DC Racing x Jota for the 1000 Miles of Sebring, the 6th round of the 2018-19 Super Season. King secured the LMP2 victory in his first endurance race and subsequently finished the season with the team. He competed in his first 24 Hours of Le Mans in June.

King has competed in two rounds of the 2019-20 Super Season with Team LNT Ginetta Cars in the LMP1 class.

Formula E
King has tested Formula E machinery twice, firstly in 2016-17 with Mahindra Racing, and again in a private test with Dragon Racing in 2019. In February 2021, it was announced that King would be taking on a sim and development driver role at Mahindra.

Racing record

Career summary

Complete Formula Renault UK results 
(key) (Races in bold indicate pole position) (Races in italics indicate fastest lap)

Complete FIA Formula Two Championship results
(key) (Races in bold indicate pole position) (Races in italics indicate fastest lap)

Complete Eurocup Formula Renault 2.0 results 
(key) (Races in bold indicate pole position) (Races in italics indicate fastest lap)

Complete British Formula 3 International Series results
(key) (Races in bold indicate pole position) (Races in italics indicate fastest lap)

Complete FIA Formula 3 European Championship results
(key)

Complete GP2 Series results
(key) (Races in bold indicate pole position) (Races in italics indicate fastest lap)

† Driver did not finish the race, but was classified as he completed over 90% of the race distance.

Complete Formula One participations
(key) (Races in bold indicate pole position) (Races in italics indicates fastest lap)

Complete FIA Formula 2 Championship results
(key) (Races in bold indicate pole position) (Races in italics indicate points for the fastest lap of top ten finishers)

American open-wheel racing results
(key) (Races in bold indicate pole position) (Races in italics indicate fastest lap)

IndyCar Series

Complete FIA World Endurance Championship results
(key) (Races in bold indicate pole position; races in italics indicate fastest lap)

24 Hours of Le Mans results

References

External links

1994 births
Living people
English racing drivers
Formula Palmer Audi drivers
Toyota Racing Series drivers
Formula Renault 2.0 NEC drivers
Formula Renault Eurocup drivers
British Formula Renault 2.0 drivers
FIA Formula Two Championship drivers
FIA Formula 3 European Championship drivers
British Formula Three Championship drivers
MRF Challenge Formula 2000 Championship drivers
FIA Institute Young Driver Excellence Academy drivers
GP2 Series drivers
FIA Formula 2 Championship drivers
IndyCar Series drivers
Indianapolis 500 drivers
24 Hours of Le Mans drivers
FIA World Endurance Championship drivers
Manor Motorsport drivers
M2 Competition drivers
MP Motorsport drivers
Carlin racing drivers
Racing Engineering drivers
Ed Carpenter Racing drivers
Rahal Letterman Lanigan Racing drivers
Karting World Championship drivers
Jota Sport drivers
People from Warwick